Wilhelm Hayden  (11 May 1926 – 16 November 1997) was a Norwegian competition rower. He competed in the 1952 Summer Olympics.

References

External links

1926 births
1997 deaths 
Sportspeople from Gjøvik
Sportspeople from Bærum
Norwegian male rowers
Olympic rowers of Norway
Rowers at the 1952 Summer Olympics